HAVELSAN is a Turkish software and systems company having business presence in the defence and IT sectors. It is headquartered in Ankara, Turkey, with subsidiary companies and offices around Turkey and abroad. Havelsan is mostly active in the fields of C4ISR, naval combat systems, E-government applications, reconnaissance surveillance and intelligence systems, management information systems, simulation and training systems, logistic support, homeland security systems and energy management systems.

History
Havelsan was established by the Turkish Air Force (TUAF) Foundation in 1982 as a Turkish company named Havelsan-Aydin in order to provide maintenance for the Turkish Air Force's high technology radars.

In 1985, Havelsan was separated from the foreign shareholders and incorporated as a national company with a share of 98% owned by the Turkish Armed Forces Foundation.

In 1997, Havelsan added command control system (C4ISR), training and simulations system and management information systems to its functions. As the "Informatics and System House of Turkey" Havelsan has been designing and planning critical defense systems such as management information system, homeland security system, simulation and training system and C4ISR.

Although Havelsan has generally been involved in military software projects, it has also taken responsibilities on e-government projects and successfully implemented them.

Havelsan is one of the subcontractors of the Peace Eagle Project. Havelsan is mainly responsible for delivering the ground support segment which consists of crew training, mission planning and software maintenance functions. Havelsan worked on becoming a main subcontractor of Boeing for Italian and Korean AEW&C projects but Boeing withdrew from this sub-contractorship in early 2009.

Sectoral position and rewards
Kal-Der, the Turkish Quality Association, published the Turkish Quality Map of 2008-2009. Introduced at the National Quality Congress held on November 12–14, 2007, Havelsan is presented as the first defence industry company on the Map.

High Election Council, Computer Supported Central Elections Registry System -SEÇSİS- which was developed by Havelsan, came first in its category services from State to Public in the 5th e-Turkey rewards and Congress Ceremony on 22 December 2007.

Havelsan keeps its leadership in the 'sectoral software' field according to Turkey's First IT Companies results. Havelsan is listed in 4th rank for income among the ten IT companies in Ankara.

Havelsan is listed at number 225 of "First 500 Company" research done by İstanbul Commercial Chamber (ISO).  In 2007, Havelsan was listed, as in 2006, included in the research of Fast Developing Companies in Turkey (Fast 50) by Deloitte for the latest five years and, in the same research, of Fast Developing Companies in Europe, Africa and Middle East (EMEA) regions in 2006.

Awarded with the prize for ”Commercial Success in New Products” in the competition ”TESİD 2006 Electronic and Information Technologies Innovation - Creativity Prizes”. In 2006, Land Registry and Cadaster Information System (TAKBİS) was selected as the ”most successful e-government project in Turkey” in the ”e-Tr Congress and Prize Ceremony, organized by Tusiad and Tubisad.

Awarded with “FAI Honorary Diploma” by Federation Aeronautique Internationale (FAI) “In the work of Turkey's the biggest 500 exporter firm”; Havelsan export for about 30 Million Dolar and became in the 337 row in 2006.

In 2004 and 2005, National Justice Information System (UYAP) was selected as the most successful e-government project in Turkey in the “e-Tr Congress and Prize Ceremony”, organized by TÜSİAD and TBV.

Products 
 BAHA, an unmanned aerial vehicle (UAV)
 Barkan, an unmanned ground vehicle (UGV)

See also
Turkish Aerospace Industries
ASELSAN

References

External links
 Havelsan

Government-owned companies of Turkey
Defence companies of Turkey
Companies established in 1982
Companies based in Ankara
Turkish brands
Turkish companies established in 1982
Unmanned aerial vehicle manufacturers of Turkey